Solomon's Temple, also known as Grinlow Tower, is a Victorian folly on the summit of Grin Low hill, near the spa town of Buxton in the Derbyshire Peak District.

On 23 February 1894, a meeting at Buxton Town Hall decided to rebuild a landmark tower that had been built by Solomon Mycock, of the Cheshire Cheese Hotel, in the early 19th century, and of which only a few stones remained. The Local Board vice-chairman had talked with the seventh Duke of Devonshire's agent and decided that the reconstruction was feasible if the townspeople would donate sufficient money. Sketches were submitted by architects W. R. Bryden and G. E. Garlick. By that May, the plans were confirmed by the Duke of Devonshire, and it was well known that the site was of prehistoric importance. In June 1894, the seventh Duke of Devonshire subscribed £25 towards building the folly. Buxton had already subscribed £50. The foundation stone was laid by Colonel Sidebottom, M.P., on 31 May 1896, witnessed by a large crowd, and the tower was opened by Victor Cavendish in September 1896. The tower was restored in 1988 by public subscription.

From the open top of the tower there are good 360-degree views over the town and the surrounding countryside and parts of the Peak District. The tower does not contain anything other than the staircase to the top. It is a Grade II listed building.

See also
Listed buildings in Buxton

References 

Folly towers in England
Peak District
Tourist attractions in Derbyshire
Tourist attractions of the Peak District
Buildings and structures in Buxton
Towers completed in 1896